Nebraska Highway 29 is a highway in western Nebraska. It has a southern terminus at U.S. Highway 26 in Mitchell and a northern terminus at U.S. Highway 20 in Harrison.

Route description
Nebraska Highway 29 begins in Mitchell at US 26. It continues north, with a short westerly segment, to Harrison, where it meets US 20 and ends.

Major intersections

References

External links

 The Nebraska Highways Page: Highways 1 to 30

029
Transportation in Scotts Bluff County, Nebraska
Transportation in Sioux County, Nebraska